Khổng Thị Hằng (born 10 October 1993) is a Vietnamese footballer who plays as a goalkeeper for Women's Championship club Than Khoáng Sản and the Vietnam women's national team.

References

1993 births
Living people
Women's association football goalkeepers
Vietnamese women's footballers
Vietnam women's international footballers
Footballers at the 2018 Asian Games
Southeast Asian Games gold medalists for Vietnam
Southeast Asian Games medalists in football
Competitors at the 2019 Southeast Asian Games
Asian Games competitors for Vietnam
21st-century Vietnamese women